Puisieux or Puisieux-au-Mont is a commune in the Pas-de-Calais department in the Hauts-de-France region of France.

Geography

Population

Places of interest
 The church of St. Denis, rebuilt, as was the rest of the village, after the First World War.
 The Commonwealth War Graves Commission cemeteries (including Queens Cemetery).
 A war memorial.

See also
 Communes of the Pas-de-Calais department

References

External links

 Serre Road CWGC cemetery No. 3
 Serre Road CWGC cemetery No. 2
 Serre Road CWGC cemetery No. 1
 The Queens CWGC cemetery
 The CWGC communal cemetery
 Puisieux on the Quid website 

Communes of Pas-de-Calais